The Jefferson Clinton Hotel, formerly known as the Dome Hotel, in the Armory Square area of Syracuse, New York, is a hotel dating from 1927.

It was designed by architect Gustavus A. Young, who also worked on the design for the Hotel Syracuse (1924).

It is a 10-story building designed in the Commercial style, incorporating light-colored brick, carved stone, and terra cotta.  It has "delicately carved stone lintels" above its second-floor windows.  These are 25 single or double windows, around three sides of the building.  It is a three-part commercial-style building.

It is a contributing building in the Armory Square Historic District, listed on the National Register of Historic Places in 1984.  The hotel is identified as the "Dome Hotel" in the NRHP nomination.

Out of surviving historic hotel buildings in the district, including the Kirk Block (c.1869), the Crown Hotel (c.l876), and the Stag Hotel (1869), the 1927-built Jefferson Clinton is the only one which has not been converted to other uses.  It continues "as one of the city's largest hotels, distinguished by its Commercial style design with carved stone lintels and smooth stone facing on the lower two stories."

Name
It is located at the intersection of W. Jefferson St. and S. Clinton St. in downtown Syracuse.  It was identified as the Dome Hotel in the 1984 listing of the historic district.  Per a tourism website, "During the Great Depression, the hotel was taken over by the City of Syracuse and was renamed the Dome Hotel. This hotel closed in 1986 and remained vacant until 2001 when it reopened as Hawthorn Suites."

Notes

References

Hotels in New York (state)
Buildings and structures in Syracuse, New York
Buildings and structures completed in 1927
1927 establishments in New York (state)